The  is a Grade 1 flat horse race in Japan open to thoroughbreds which are three-years-old or above. It is run over a distance of 1,200 metres (approximately 6 furlongs) at Nakayama Racecourse, and it takes place annually in late September or early October.

It was first run in 1967, and was given Domestic Grade 3 status when race grading was introduced to Japan in 1984. This was elevated to Domestic Grade 2 in 1987, Domestic Grade 1 in 1990, and to its present level in 2006. Horses trained outside Japan have been eligible to run in the race since 1994. Prior to 2000 the race was run in December, the week before the Arima Kinen (Grand Prix).

It is now the seventh leg in the nine race Global Sprint Challenge series, preceded by the July Cup and followed by The Age Classic.

The 2014 running of the Sprinters Stakes was held at Niigata Racecourse, since Nakayama Racecourse was closed for renovations to the grandstand. The race was previously held in Niigata in 2002.

Winners since 1994

 The 2002 race took place at Niigata Racecourse.

Earlier winners 

 1967 - Onward Hill
 1968 - Suzu Hayate 
 1969 - Takeshiba O
 1970 - Tamami
 1971 - Kensachi
 1972 - Noboru Toko 
 1973 - Kyoei Green 
 1974 - Sakura Iwai 
 1975 - Sakura Iwai
 1976 - Jumbo King 
 1977 - Meiwa Kimiko 
 1978 - Meiwa Kimiko
 1979 - Sunny Flower 
 1981 - Sakura God 
 1982 - Sakura Shingeki 
 1983 - Shin Wolf 
 1984 - Happy Progress 
 1985 - Marutaka Storm
 1986 - Dokan Tesco 
 1987 - King Frolic 
 1988 - Dyna Actress 
 1989 - Winning Smile 
 1990 - Bamboo Memory 
 1991 - Daiichi Ruby
 1992 - Nishino Flower 
 1993 - Sakura Bakushin O

See also
 Horse racing in Japan
 List of Japanese flat horse races

References 
Racing Post: 

External links 
Horse Racing in Japan
Centaur Stakes and Sprinters Stakes

Open sprint category horse races
Horse races in Japan
Turf races in Japan
1967 establishments in Japan
Recurring sporting events established in 1967